Lin-ay sang Negros 2012, the 18th edition of the annual Lin-ay sang Negros pageant was held on April 13, 2012 at the Pana-ad Stadium. A total of 13 cities and municipalities sent their representatives. Ann Marie Malayo of Hinoba-an, crowned her successor, Mass Communication student Alyssa Marie E. Villarico of Bacolod City, at the end of the event.

Final Results

Corporate Awards

Special awards

Contestants

Other Pageant Notes

Historical Significance

Bacolod City  won its 3rd Lin-ay sang Negros title.
Bacolod City, Talisay City, Victorias City, Silay City, San Carlos City and Hinoba-an also placed in last year's pageant
Bacolod City also placed Top 3 in last year's pageant.

Withdrawal and Replacement
Alyssa Villarico was 2012 Masskara Festival Queen, 2nd Runner Up. Alexis Danica Drilon, the winner decided not to represent the city because of her academic commitments. Two years after, she went on to represent the city and adjudged Lin-ay sang Negros 2014.

Panel of Judges

Leonilo Agustin - Department of Tourism Consultant
Vicky Marie Milagrosa Rushton - 2009 Lin-ay sang Negros and 2011 Mutya ng Pilipinas International
Helen Nicolette Henson - 2011 Miss World-Philippines 1st Princess
Raphael Kieffer - Model
Blance Marie Brown - 2004 Lin-ay sang Negros

Hosts

Binibining Pilipinas-World 2006 Ann Mariz Igpit
GMA star Victor Aliwalas

References

Beauty pageants in the Philippines
Culture of Negros Occidental
2012 beauty pageants
2012 in the Philippines